An Irish Indian is an Indian citizen who is fully or partially of Irish descent, who is aware of such ancestry and remains connected, to some degree, to Irish culture and also can be an Irish-born person who is of Indian origin. As per article 366(2) of the Indian Constitution, an Irish Indian can be categorized as an Anglo-Indian.

History 
Irish people were known to have traveled to India from at least the days of the East India Company. While most of the early Irish came as traders, some also came as soldiers. Prominent among them were the generals Arthur Wellesley, 1st Duke of Wellington who later became Prime Minister of the United Kingdom and his brother, Lord Charles Wellesley, both of whom were from the Protestant Anglo-Irish landowning class. During the 19th century, a number of missionaries and educationists were involved in setting-up educational, healthcare and other institutions in India. Later in the 19th century, a number of philosophers and Catholic Irish nationalists travelled to India, including the theosophist Annie Besant. It is widely believed that there existed a secret alliance between the Irish and Indian independence movements. Some Indian intellectuals like Jawaharlal Nehru and V. V. Giri were likely inspired by Irish nationalists when they studied in the United Kingdom. Indian Immigrants who have emigrated to Ireland in the recent years might have had their children born and raised here.

Culture
One of the cultural activities that Indians of Irish descent (who are aware of their Irish ancestry) participate in is Saint Patrick's Day.

Notable people

 Amala Akkineni - Actress
 Annie Besant - Theosophist and Indian independence activist
 James Cousins - Writer
 Margaret Cousins - Educationist, suffragist and Theosophist
 S. M. Cyril - Internationally recognized educational innovator
 Spike Milligan - comedian, writer, poet, playwright and actor
 Cyrus Pallonji Mistry - Former Chairman of Tata Group
 Sister Nivedita - Disciple of Swami Vivekananda
 Derek O'Brien - Member of Parliament, Rajya Sabha, author and quiz show host
 Leo Varadkar - Taoiseach of the Republic of Ireland
 Gavin Packard - A Bollywood and Mollywood villainous actor. 3rd Generation Irish American

Company and British India Officers of Irish and Anglo-Irish ancestry
 Barry Close - General, East India Company 
 Eyre Coote (East India Company officer)
 Robert Rollo Gillespie - Major-general
 William Nassau Lees - Major-general
 Robert Montgomery (colonial administrator)
 John Nicholson (East India Company officer)
 Michael O'Dwyer - Lieutenant Governor of the Punjab 
 Joseph O'Halloran - major-general, East India Company
 William Olpherts - General, Indian army
 Eldred Pottinger, Major East India Company
 Henry Pottinger - Lieutenant General, East India Company 
 Abraham Roberts - General
 Richard Hieram Sankey - Lieutenant General
 Charles Stuart (East India Company officer)
 Ephraim Gerrish Stannus - Major-General, East India Company 
 James Travers - General, East India Company
 Hugh Wheeler (East India Company officer)
 Frederick Young (East India Company officer)
 Arthur Wellesley, 1st Duke of Wellington - Major General, East India Company
 Richard Wellesley, 1st Marquess Wellesley - Governor-General of Bengal

See also
 India–Ireland relations
 Anglo-Indian
Indian diaspora
kim (novel)

References 

Europeans in India
Irish
Irish diaspora